Saint-Maudan is a commune in the Côtes-d'Armor department of Brittany in northwestern France.

Population

Inhabitants of Saint-Maudan are called meldanais or maudanais in French.

See also
 Communes of the Côtes-d'Armor department

References

External links

 

Communes of Côtes-d'Armor